Susanne Birgitta Ås Sivborg is the Director of Lantmäteriet (Swedish National Land Survey) since 1 January 2018. Before that, she was Director General of the Swedish Patent and Registration Office. She was candidate for the position of President of the European Patent Office, which was to be filled on 1 July 2010, but was not elected to the position.

References

Further reading
Biography on the European Patent Office (EPO) web site
Biography on the World Intellectual Property Organization (WIPO) web site
Questions by epi to the candidates for the position as President of the EPO, Ms. Susanne Ås Sivborg by the European Patent Institute (epi), October 2009.

Year of birth missing (living people)
Living people
Swedish civil servants